The 2009 World Archery Championships was the 45th edition of the event. It was held at the Ulsan Munsu International Archery Field in Ulsan, South Korea on 1–9 September 2009 and were organized by the World Archery Federation (FITA).

This was the last edition without a Mixed Team competition, which was included as a demonstration event.

Medals table

Medals summary

Recurve

Compound

References

External links
 World Archery website
 Complete results

 
World Championship
World Archery
World Archery Championships
Sport in Ulsan
International archery competitions hosted by South Korea
September 2009 sports events in South Korea